Petrovsky (masculine), Petrovskaya (feminine), or Petrovskoye (neuter) is the name of various inhabited localities in Russia.

Modern localities

Altai Krai
As of 2012, two rural localities in Altai Krai bear this name:
Petrovsky, Novichikhinsky District, Altai Krai, a settlement in Lobanikhinsky Selsoviet of Novichikhinsky District; 
Petrovsky, Pankrushikhinsky District, Altai Krai, a settlement in Lukovsky Selsoviet of Pankrushikhinsky District;

Arkhangelsk Oblast
As of 2012, three rural localities in Arkhangelsk Oblast bear this name:
Petrovskaya, Kargopolsky District, Arkhangelsk Oblast, a village in Pechnikovsky Selsoviet of Kargopolsky District
Petrovskaya, Kotlassky District, Arkhangelsk Oblast, a village in Revazhsky Selsoviet of Kotlassky District
Petrovskaya, Shenkursky District, Arkhangelsk Oblast, a village in Nikolsky Selsoviet of Shenkursky District

Astrakhan Oblast
As of 2012, one rural locality in Astrakhan Oblast bears this name:
Petrovsky, Astrakhan Oblast, a settlement in Sedlistinsky Selsoviet of Ikryaninsky District;

Republic of Bashkortostan
As of 2012, three rural localities in the Republic of Bashkortostan bear this name:
Petrovsky, Republic of Bashkortostan, a khutor in Alexandrovsky Selsoviet of Meleuzovsky District
Petrovskoye, Iglinsky District, Republic of Bashkortostan, a village in Kaltovsky Selsoviet of Iglinsky District
Petrovskoye, Ishimbaysky District, Republic of Bashkortostan, a selo in Petrovsky Selsoviet of Ishimbaysky District

Belgorod Oblast
As of 2012, four rural localities in Belgorod Oblast bear this name:
Petrovsky, Chernyansky District, Belgorod Oblast, a khutor in Chernyansky District
Petrovsky, Prokhorovsky District, Belgorod Oblast, a khutor in Prokhorovsky District
Petrovsky, Rakityansky District, Belgorod Oblast, a khutor under the administrative jurisdiction of Proletarsky Settlement Okrug in Rakityansky District
Petrovsky, Starooskolsky District, Belgorod Oblast, a settlement in Starooskolsky District

Bryansk Oblast
As of 2012, three rural localities in Bryansk Oblast bear this name:
Petrovsky, Klimovsky District, Bryansk Oblast, a settlement in Istopsky Rural Administrative Okrug of Klimovsky District; 
Petrovsky, Pochepsky District, Bryansk Oblast, a settlement in Krasnorogsky Rural Administrative Okrug of Pochepsky District; 
Petrovsky, Surazhsky District, Bryansk Oblast, a settlement in Ovchinsky Rural Administrative Okrug of Surazhsky District;

Chelyabinsk Oblast
As of 2012, four rural localities in Chelyabinsk Oblast bear this name:
Petrovsky, Krasnoarmeysky District, Chelyabinsk Oblast, a settlement in Petrovsky Selsoviet of Krasnoarmeysky District
Petrovsky, Nagaybaksky District, Chelyabinsk Oblast, a settlement in Nagaybaksky Selsoviet of Nagaybaksky District
Petrovsky, Oktyabrsky District, Chelyabinsk Oblast, a settlement in Krutoyarsky Selsoviet of Oktyabrsky District
Petrovskoye, Chelyabinsk Oblast, a selo in Petrovsky Selsoviet of Uvelsky District

Ivanovo Oblast
As of 2012, five inhabited localities in Ivanovo Oblast bear this name.

Urban localities
Petrovsky, Ivanovo Oblast, a settlement in Gavrilovo-Posadsky District

Rural localities
Petrovskoye, Ivanovsky District, Ivanovo Oblast, a village in Ivanovsky District
Petrovskoye, Komsomolsky District, Ivanovo Oblast, a village in Komsomolsky District
Petrovskoye, Lezhnevsky District, Ivanovo Oblast, a selo in Lezhnevsky District
Petrovskoye, Privolzhsky District, Ivanovo Oblast, a village in Privolzhsky District

Kaliningrad Oblast
As of 2012, one rural locality in Kaliningrad Oblast bears this name:
Petrovskoye, Kaliningrad Oblast, a settlement in Prigorodny Rural Okrug of Nesterovsky District

Kaluga Oblast
As of 2012, four rural localities in Kaluga Oblast bear this name:
Petrovsky, Lyudinovsky District, Kaluga Oblast, a village in Lyudinovsky District
Petrovsky, Meshchovsky District, Kaluga Oblast, a settlement in Meshchovsky District
Petrovskoye, Kuybyshevsky District, Kaluga Oblast, a selo in Kuybyshevsky District
Petrovskoye, Peremyshlsky District, Kaluga Oblast, a village in Peremyshlsky District

Kemerovo Oblast
As of 2012, two rural localities in Kemerovo Oblast bear this name:
Petrovsky, Belovsky District, Kemerovo Oblast, a settlement in Vishnevskaya Rural Territory of Belovsky District; 
Petrovsky, Leninsk-Kuznetsky District, Kemerovo Oblast, a settlement in Dracheninskaya Rural Territory of Leninsk-Kuznetsky District;

Kirov Oblast
As of 2012, four rural localities in Kirov Oblast bear this name:
Petrovskoye, Shabalinsky District, Kirov Oblast (or Petrovskaya), a village in Gostovsky Rural Okrug of Shabalinsky District; 
Petrovskoye, Urzhumsky District, Kirov Oblast (or Petrovsky), a selo in Petrovsky Rural Okrug of Urzhumsky District; 
Petrovskaya, Afanasyevsky District, Kirov Oblast, a village in Ichetovkinsky Rural Okrug of Afanasyevsky District; 
Petrovskaya, Oparinsky District, Kirov Oblast, a village in Vazyuksky Rural Okrug of Oparinsky District;

Kostroma Oblast
As of 2012, six rural localities in Kostroma Oblast bear this name:
Petrovskoye, Chukhlomsky District, Kostroma Oblast (or Petrovskaya), a village in Petrovskoye Settlement of Chukhlomsky District; 
Petrovskoye, Galichsky District, Kostroma Oblast, a village in Dmitriyevskoye Settlement of Galichsky District; 
Petrovskoye, Nerekhtsky District, Kostroma Oblast, a village in Voskresenskoye Settlement of Nerekhtsky District; 
Petrovskoye, Susaninsky District, Kostroma Oblast, a village in Buyakovskoye Settlement of Susaninsky District; 
Petrovskaya, Oktyabrsky District, Kostroma Oblast, a village in Pokrovskoye Settlement of Oktyabrsky District; 
Petrovskaya, Vokhomsky District, Kostroma Oblast, a village in Lapshinskoye Settlement of Vokhomsky District;

Krasnodar Krai
As of 2012, three rural localities in Krasnodar Krai bear this name:
Petrovsky, Krasnodar Krai, a khutor in Sokolovsky Rural Okrug of Gulkevichsky District; 
Petrovskoye, Krasnodar Krai, a selo in Blagodarnensky Rural Okrug of Otradnensky District; 
Petrovskaya, Krasnodar Krai, a stanitsa in Petrovsky Rural Okrug of Slavyansky District;

Kurgan Oblast
As of 2012, two rural localities in Kurgan Oblast bear this name:
Petrovskoye, Shchuchansky District, Kurgan Oblast (or Petrovsky, Petrovskaya), a selo in Petrovsky Selsoviet of Shchuchansky District; 
Petrovskoye, Yurgamyshsky District, Kurgan Oblast, a selo in Krasnouralsky Selsoviet of Yurgamyshsky District;

Kursk Oblast
As of 2012, seven rural localities in Kursk Oblast bear this name:
Petrovsky, Manturovsky District, Kursk Oblast, a khutor in Repetsky Selsoviet of Manturovsky District
Petrovsky, Pristensky District, Kursk Oblast, a khutor in Rakitinsky Selsoviet of Pristensky District
Petrovsky, Zolotukhinsky District, Kursk Oblast, a khutor in Revolyutsionny Selsoviet of Zolotukhinsky District
Petrovskoye, Khomutovsky District, Kursk Oblast, a selo in Petrovsky Selsoviet of Khomutovsky District
Petrovskoye, Korenevsky District, Kursk Oblast, a village in Plodosovkhozsky Selsoviet of Korenevsky District
Petrovskoye, Kursky District, Kursk Oblast, a village in Troitsky Selsoviet of Kursky District
Petrovskoye, Sovetsky District, Kursk Oblast, a selo in Krasnodolinsky Selsoviet of Sovetsky District

Leningrad Oblast
As of 2012, two rural localities in Leningrad Oblast bear this name:
Petrovskoye, Lomonosovsky District, Leningrad Oblast (or Petrovskaya), a village in Orzhitskoye Settlement Municipal Formation of Lomonosovsky District; 
Petrovskoye, Priozersky District, Leningrad Oblast, a settlement in Petrovskoye Settlement Municipal Formation of Priozersky District;

Lipetsk Oblast
As of 2012, four rural localities in Lipetsk Oblast bear this name:
Petrovsky, Lipetsk Oblast, a settlement in Speshnevo-Ivanovsky Selsoviet of Dankovsky District; 
Petrovskoye, Izmalkovsky District, Lipetsk Oblast, a selo in Petrovsky Selsoviet of Izmalkovsky District; 
Petrovskoye, Terbunsky District, Lipetsk Oblast, a village in Soldatsky Selsoviet of Terbunsky District; 
Petrovskoye, Volovsky District, Lipetsk Oblast (or Petrovskaya), a village in Zamaraysky Selsoviet of Volovsky District;

Mari El Republic
As of 2012, three rural localities in the Mari El Republic bear this name:
Petrovskoye, Mari-Tureksky District, Mari El Republic, a village under the administrative jurisdiction of Mari-Turek Urban-Type Settlement in Mari-Tureksky District; 
Petrovskoye, Morkinsky District, Mari El Republic, a selo in Semisolinsky Rural Okrug of Morkinsky District; 
Petrovskoye, Yurinsky District, Mari El Republic, a village in Vasilyevsky Rural Okrug of Yurinsky District;

Moscow Oblast
As of 2012, thirteen rural localities in Moscow Oblast bear this name:
Petrovskoye, Ivanovskoye Rural Settlement, Istrinsky District, Moscow Oblast (or Petrovskaya), a village in Ivanovskoye Rural Settlement of Istrinsky District; 
Petrovskoye, Snegiri, Istrinsky District, Moscow Oblast, a village under the administrative jurisdiction of Snegiri Suburban Settlement in Istrinsky District; 
Petrovskoye, Klinsky District, Moscow Oblast, a selo in Petrovskoye Rural Settlement of Klinsky District; 
Petrovskoye, Lotoshinsky District, Moscow Oblast (or Petrovskaya), a village in Mikulinskoye Rural Settlement of Lotoshinsky District; 
Petrovskoye, Veselevskoye Rural Settlement, Naro-Fominsky District, Moscow Oblast (or Petrovskaya), a village in Veselevskoye Rural Settlement of Naro-Fominsky District; 
Petrovskoye, Kalininets, Naro-Fominsky District, Moscow Oblast, a selo under the administrative jurisdiction of Kalininets Work Settlement in Naro-Fominsky District; 
Petrovskoye, Kuznetsovskoye Rural Settlement, Ramensky District, Moscow Oblast (or Petrovskaya), a village in Kuznetsovskoye Rural Settlement of Ramensky District; 
Petrovskoye, Sofyinskoye Rural Settlement, Ramensky District, Moscow Oblast, a selo in Sofyinskoye Rural Settlement of Ramensky District; 
Petrovskoye, Serpukhovsky District, Moscow Oblast (or Petrovskaya), a village in Vasilyevskoye Rural Settlement of Serpukhovsky District; 
Petrovskoye, Shatursky District, Moscow Oblast (or Petrovskaya), a selo under the administrative jurisdiction of the Town of Shatura in Shatursky District; 
Petrovskoye, Shchyolkovsky District, Moscow Oblast, a selo in Ogudnevskoye Rural Settlement of Shchyolkovsky District; 
Petrovskoye, Volokolamsky District, Moscow Oblast (or Petrovskaya), a village in Yaropoletskoye Rural Settlement of Volokolamsky District; 
Petrovskoye, Voskresensky District, Moscow Oblast, a selo in Fedinskoye Rural Settlement of Voskresensky District;

Nizhny Novgorod Oblast
As of 2012, one rural locality in Nizhny Novgorod Oblast bears this name:
Petrovsky, Nizhny Novgorod Oblast, a settlement in Otarsky Selsoviet of Vorotynsky District;

Novgorod Oblast
As of 2012, four rural localities in Novgorod Oblast bear this name:
Petrovskoye, Borovichsky District, Novgorod Oblast, a village in Travkovskoye Settlement of Borovichsky District
Petrovskoye, Demyansky District, Novgorod Oblast, a village in Zhirkovskoye Settlement of Demyansky District
Petrovskoye, Lyubytinsky District, Novgorod Oblast, a village under the administrative jurisdiction of Nebolchskoye Settlement in Lyubytinsky District
Petrovskoye, Pestovsky District, Novgorod Oblast, a village in Bykovskoye Settlement of Pestovsky District

Novosibirsk Oblast
As of 2012, two rural localities in Novosibirsk Oblast bear this name:
Petrovsky, Kargatsky District, Novosibirsk Oblast, a settlement in Kargatsky District
Petrovsky, Ordynsky District, Novosibirsk Oblast, a settlement in Ordynsky District

Orenburg Oblast
As of 2012, two rural localities in Orenburg Oblast bear this name:
Petrovskoye, Krasnogvardeysky District, Orenburg Oblast, a selo in Dmitriyevsky Selsoviet of Krasnogvardeysky District
Petrovskoye, Saraktashsky District, Orenburg Oblast, a selo in Petrovsky Selsoviet of Saraktashsky District

Oryol Oblast
As of 2012, three rural localities in Oryol Oblast bear this name:
Petrovsky, Dmitrovsky District, Oryol Oblast, a settlement in Berezovsky Selsoviet of Dmitrovsky District
Petrovsky, Sverdlovsky District, Oryol Oblast, a settlement in Yakovlevsky Selsoviet of Sverdlovsky District
Petrovskoye, Oryol Oblast, a village in Cheremoshensky Selsoviet of Mtsensky District

Penza Oblast
As of 2012, one rural locality in Penza Oblast bears this name:
Petrovskoye, Penza Oblast, a selo in Vysokinsky Selsoviet of Bashmakovsky District

Pskov Oblast
As of 2012, four rural localities in Pskov Oblast bear this name:
Petrovskoye, Loknyansky District, Pskov Oblast, a village in Loknyansky District
Petrovskoye, Novorzhevsky District, Pskov Oblast, a village in Novorzhevsky District
Petrovskoye, Pushkinogorsky District, Pskov Oblast, a village in Pushkinogorsky District
Petrovskaya, Pskov Oblast, a village in Opochetsky District

Rostov Oblast
As of 2012, seven rural localities in Rostov Oblast bear this name:
Petrovsky, Azovsky District, Rostov Oblast, a khutor in Kagalnitskoye Rural Settlement of Azovsky District
Petrovsky, Chertkovsky District, Rostov Oblast, a khutor in Olkhovchanskoye Rural Settlement of Chertkovsky District
Petrovsky, Krasnosulinsky District, Rostov Oblast, a khutor in Kiselevskoye Rural Settlement of Krasnosulinsky District
Petrovsky, Millerovsky District, Rostov Oblast, a khutor in Voloshinskoye Rural Settlement of Millerovsky District
Petrovsky, Milyutinsky District, Rostov Oblast, a khutor in Lukichevskoye Rural Settlement of Milyutinsky District
Petrovsky, Neklinovsky District, Rostov Oblast, a khutor in Fedorovskoye Rural Settlement of Neklinovsky District
Petrovsky, Zimovnikovsky District, Rostov Oblast, a khutor in Kuteynikovskoye Rural Settlement of Zimovnikovsky District

Ryazan Oblast
As of 2012, one rural locality in Ryazan Oblast bears this name:
Petrovskoye, Ryazan Oblast, a village in Pionersky Rural Okrug of Rybnovsky District

Samara Oblast
As of 2012, two rural localities in Samara Oblast bear this name:
Petrovsky, Bogatovsky District, Samara Oblast, a settlement in Bogatovsky District
Petrovsky, Bolshechernigovsky District, Samara Oblast, a settlement in Bolshechernigovsky District

Saratov Oblast
As of 2012, two rural localities in Saratov Oblast bear this name:
Petrovsky, Saratov Oblast, a settlement in Krasnopartizansky District
Petrovskoye, Saratov Oblast, a selo in Pugachyovsky District

Smolensk Oblast
As of 2012, four rural localities in Smolensk Oblast bear this name:
Petrovskoye, Baklanovskoye Rural Settlement, Demidovsky District, Smolensk Oblast, a village in Baklanovskoye Rural Settlement of Demidovsky District
Petrovskoye, Zakustishchenskoye Rural Settlement, Demidovsky District, Smolensk Oblast, a village in Zakustishchenskoye Rural Settlement of Demidovsky District
Petrovskoye, Novoduginsky District, Smolensk Oblast, a village in Izvekovskoye Rural Settlement of Novoduginsky District
Petrovskoye, Roslavlsky District, Smolensk Oblast, a village in Ivanovskoye Rural Settlement of Roslavlsky District

Stavropol Krai
As of 2012, three rural localities in Stavropol Krai bear this name:
Petrovsky, Kochubeyevsky District, Stavropol Krai, a khutor in Ivanovsky Selsoviet of Kochubeyevsky District
Petrovsky, Novoalexandrovsky District, Stavropol Krai, a khutor in Razdolnensky Selsoviet of Novoalexandrovsky District
Petrovsky, Sovetsky District, Stavropol Krai, a khutor in Soldato-Alexsandrovsky Selsoviet of Sovetsky District

Tambov Oblast
As of 2015, six rural localities in Tambov Oblast bear this name:
Petrovskoye, Muchkapsky District, Tambov Oblast, a selo in Krasnokustovsky Selsoviet of Muchkapsky District
Petrovskoye, Petrovsky District, Tambov Oblast, a selo in Petrovsky Selsoviet of Petrovsky District
Petrovskoye, Pichayevsky District, Tambov Oblast, a village in Bolshelomovissky Selsoviet of Pichayevsky District
Petrovskoye, Tokaryovsky District, Tambov Oblast, a village in Chicherinsky Selsoviet of Tokaryovsky District
Petrovskoye, Zherdevsky District, Tambov Oblast, a selo in Tugolukovsky Selsoviet of Zherdevsky District
Petrovskaya, Tambov Oblast, a village in Yurlovsky Selsoviet of Nikiforovsky District

Republic of Tatarstan
As of 2012, two rural localities in the Republic of Tatarstan bear this name:
Petrovsky, Nurlatsky District, Republic of Tatarstan, a settlement in Nurlatsky District
Petrovsky, Tyulyachinsky District, Republic of Tatarstan, a settlement in Tyulyachinsky District

Tula Oblast
As of 2012, nine rural localities in Tula Oblast bear this name:
Petrovsky, Tula Oblast, a settlement in Inshinsky Rural Okrug of Leninsky District
Petrovskoye, Luzhenskaya Rural Administration, Chernsky District, Tula Oblast, a village in Luzhenskaya Rural Administration of Chernsky District
Petrovskoye, Turgenevskaya Rural Administration, Chernsky District, Tula Oblast, a village in Turgenevskaya Rural Administration of Chernsky District
Petrovskoye, Kimovsky District, Tula Oblast, a village in Lvovsky Rural Okrug of Kimovsky District
Petrovskoye, Odoyevsky District, Tula Oblast, a selo in Odoyevskaya Rural Administration of Odoyevsky District
Petrovskoye, Shchyokinsky District, Tula Oblast, a village in Petrovskaya Rural Administration of Shchyokinsky District
Petrovskoye, Tyoplo-Ogaryovsky District, Tula Oblast, a village in Gorkovsky Rural Okrug of Tyoplo-Ogaryovsky District
Petrovskoye, Uzlovsky District, Tula Oblast, a village in Akimo-Ilyinskaya Rural Administration of Uzlovsky District
Petrovskoye, Yefremovsky District, Tula Oblast, a village in Yandovsky Rural Okrug of Yefremovsky District

Tver Oblast
As of 2012, ten rural localities in Tver Oblast bear this name:
Petrovskoye, Kalininsky District, Tver Oblast, a selo in Verkhnevolzhskoye Rural Settlement of Kalininsky District
Petrovskoye, Kesovogorsky District, Tver Oblast, a village in Kesovskoye Rural Settlement of Kesovogorsky District
Petrovskoye, Kimrsky District, Tver Oblast, a village in Pechetovskoye Rural Settlement of Kimrsky District
Petrovskoye, Ostashkovsky District, Tver Oblast, a village in Zhdanovskoye Rural Settlement of Ostashkovsky District
Petrovskoye, Rameshkovsky District, Tver Oblast, a village in Ilgoshchi Rural Settlement of Rameshkovsky District
Petrovskoye, Bolshemalinskoye Rural Settlement, Sandovsky District, Tver Oblast, a village in Bolshemalinskoye Rural Settlement of Sandovsky District
Petrovskoye, Lukinskoye Rural Settlement, Sandovsky District, Tver Oblast, a village in Lukinskoye Rural Settlement of Sandovsky District
Petrovskoye, Sonkovsky District, Tver Oblast, a selo in Petrovskoye Rural Settlement of Sonkovsky District
Petrovskoye, Vesyegonsky District, Tver Oblast, a village in Proninskoye Rural Settlement of Vesyegonsky District
Petrovskoye, Zubtsovsky District, Tver Oblast, a village in Pogorelskoye Rural Settlement of Zubtsovsky District

Ulyanovsk Oblast
As of 2012, one rural locality in Ulyanovsk Oblast bears this name:
Petrovskoye, Ulyanovsk Oblast, a selo in Bogdashkinsky Rural Okrug of Cherdaklinsky District

Vladimir Oblast
As of 2012, two rural localities in Vladimir Oblast bear this name:
Petrovskoye, Kovrovsky District, Vladimir Oblast, a village in Kovrovsky District
Petrovskoye, Selivanovsky District, Vladimir Oblast, a village in Selivanovsky District

Volgograd Oblast
As of 2012, one rural locality in Volgograd Oblast bears this name:
Petrovsky, Volgograd Oblast, a khutor in Petrovsky Selsoviet of Uryupinsky District

Vologda Oblast
As of 2012, eight rural localities in Vologda Oblast bear this name:
Petrovskoye, Cherepovetsky District, Vologda Oblast, a village in Ilyinsky Selsoviet of Cherepovetsky District
Petrovskoye, Talitsky Selsoviet, Kirillovsky District, Vologda Oblast, a selo in Talitsky Selsoviet of Kirillovsky District
Petrovskoye, Volokoslavinsky Selsoviet, Kirillovsky District, Vologda Oblast, a selo in Volokoslavinsky Selsoviet of Kirillovsky District
Petrovskoye, Sokolsky District, Vologda Oblast, a village in Dvinitsky Selsoviet of Sokolsky District
Petrovskoye, Vologodsky District, Vologda Oblast, a village in Spassky Selsoviet of Vologodsky District
Petrovskaya, Velikoustyugsky District, Vologda Oblast, a village in Yudinsky Selsoviet of Velikoustyugsky District
Petrovskaya, Verkhovazhsky District, Vologda Oblast, a village in Klimushinsky Selsoviet of Verkhovazhsky District
Petrovskaya, Vozhegodsky District, Vologda Oblast, a village in Vozhegodsky Selsoviet of Vozhegodsky District

Voronezh Oblast
As of 2012, four rural localities in Voronezh Oblast bear this name:
Petrovskoye, Borisoglebsky Urban Okrug, Voronezh Oblast, a selo under the administrative jurisdiction of Borisoglebsky Urban Okrug
Petrovskoye, Liskinsky District, Voronezh Oblast, a selo in Petrovskoye Rural Settlement of Liskinsky District
Petrovskoye, Paninsky District, Voronezh Oblast, a selo under the administrative jurisdiction of Pereleshinskoye Urban Settlement in Paninsky District
Petrovskoye, Ramonsky District, Voronezh Oblast, a settlement in Komsomolskoye Rural Settlement of Ramonsky District

Yaroslavl Oblast
As of 2012, nine inhabited localities in Yaroslavl Oblast bear this name:

Urban localities
Petrovskoye, Rostovsky District, Yaroslavl Oblast, a work settlement in Rostovsky District

Rural localities
Petrovskoye, Bolsheselsky District, Yaroslavl Oblast, a village in Chudinovsky Rural Okrug of Bolsheselsky District
Petrovskoye, Breytovsky District, Yaroslavl Oblast, a village in Prozorovsky Rural Okrug of Breytovsky District
Petrovskoye, Danilovsky District, Yaroslavl Oblast, a village in Trofimovsky Rural Okrug of Danilovsky District
Petrovskoye, Okhotinsky Rural Okrug, Myshkinsky District, Yaroslavl Oblast, a village in Okhotinsky Rural Okrug of Myshkinsky District
Petrovskoye, Zarubinsky Rural Okrug, Myshkinsky District, Yaroslavl Oblast, a village in Zarubinsky Rural Okrug of Myshkinsky District
Petrovskoye, Pereslavsky District, Yaroslavl Oblast, a selo in Skoblevsky Rural Okrug of Pereslavsky District
Petrovskoye, Poshekhonsky District, Yaroslavl Oblast, a village in Krasnovsky Rural Okrug of Poshekhonsky District
Petrovskoye, Yaroslavsky District, Yaroslavl Oblast, a village in Karabikhsky Rural Okrug of Yaroslavsky District

Abolished localities
Petrovsky, Pogarsky District, Bryansk Oblast, a khutor in Andreykovichsky Selsoviet of Pogarsky District in Bryansk Oblast; abolished in February 2009
Petrovskoye, Nizhny Novgorod Oblast, a village in Bolshekuverbsky Selsoviet of Tonshayevsky District in Nizhny Novgorod Oblast; abolished in August 2009
Petrovskoye (abolished), Tokaryovsky District, Tambov Oblast, a village in Chicherinsky Selsoviet of Tokaryovsky District in Tambov Oblast; merged into the selo of Lvovo in April 2015

Renamed localities
Petrovskoye, name of Makhachkala, a city in the Republic of Dagestan, from 1844 to 1857
Petrovskaya, name of Petrovskaya 1-ya, a village in Ichetovkinsky Rural Okrug of Afanasyevsky District in Kirov Oblast, before November 2008;

Alternative names
Petrovskaya, alternative name of Petrovskaya 1-ya, a village in Ichetovkinsky Rural Okrug of Afanasyevsky District in Kirov Oblast; 
Petrovskaya, alternative name of Bolshoye Petrovskoye, a village in Stremilovskoye Rural Settlement of Chekhovsky District in Moscow Oblast; 
Petrovsky, alternative name of Petrovka, a village in Krasnoorlovskaya Rural Territory of Mariinsky District in Kemerovo Oblast; 
Petrovsky, alternative name of Petrovka, a selo in Breslavsky Selsoviet of Usmansky District in Lipetsk Oblast; 
Petrovskoye, alternative name of Petrovsk, a village in Semyachkovsky Rural Administrative Okrug of Trubchevsky District in Bryansk Oblast; 
Petrovskoye, alternative name of Petrovka, a village in Polovinsky Selsoviet of Polovinsky District in Kurgan Oblast; 
Petrovskoye, alternative name of Bolshoye Petrovskoye, a village in Teryayevskoye Rural Settlement of Volokolamsky District in Moscow Oblast; 
Petrovskoye, alternative name of Petrovka, a selo in Petrovsky Selsoviet of Troitsky District in Altai Krai; 
Petrovskoye, alternative name of Novopetrovka, a selo in Petrovsky Selsoviet of Dobrinsky District in Lipetsk Oblast; 
Petrovskoye, alternative name of Novopetrovskoye, a selo in Novopetrovskoye Rural Settlement of Istrinsky District in Moscow Oblast; 
Petrovskoye, alternative name of Petrovo-Dalneye, a selo in Ilyinskoye Rural Settlement of Krasnogorsky District in Moscow Oblast;